is a railway station on the Odakyu Odawara Line in Shibuya-ku, Tokyo, Japan, operated by the private railway operator Odakyu Electric Railway.

Station layout

Originally, the station had two side platforms serving two tracks. However, the station had been converted from two side platforms to a single island platform with half-height platform edge doors. The new station was completed in 2019.

Platforms

History
The station opened on 1 April 1927.

Station numbering was introduced in 2014 with Yoyogi-Hachiman being assigned station number OH04.

Renovation works were completed in 2019 and trains switched to the new layout beginning on 16 March of that year.

Surrounding area
 Yoyogi Park
 Yoyogi-Koen Station (Tokyo Metro Chiyoda Line)

External links

Odakyu - Yoyogi Station Map

References 

Railway stations in Japan opened in 1927
Odakyu Odawara Line
Stations of Odakyu Electric Railway
Railway stations in Tokyo